Erbach may refer to:

Places
Erbach im Odenwald, a town in Hesse, Germany
Erbach an der Donau, a town on the Danube River in Baden-Württemberg, Germany
Erbach, Rheingau, a district of Eltville, Hesse, Germany
Erbach, Rhineland-Palatinate, a municipality in Rhineland-Palatinate, Germany
Erbach (Blies), a river of Saarland, Germany, tributary of the Blies
Erbach, a constituent community of Bad Camberg in Hesse, Germany
Erbach, a district of Homburg, Saarland, Germany

People
Christian Erbach (ca. 1568 – 1635), German organist and composer
, German aristocratic family